Paul Joseph Watson (born 24 May 1982) is a British far-right YouTuber, radio host, and conspiracy theorist. Until July 2016, Watson embraced the label "alt-right", but he now identifies as part of the New Right. In May 2019, Facebook and Instagram permanently banned Watson for violation of hate speech policies.

Watson's career emerged through his work for conspiracy theorist and radio host Alex Jones. As editor-at-large of Jones' website InfoWars, he helped promote fake news and advocated for 9/11, chemtrail, and New World Order conspiracy theories. Subsequently, reaching a significant audience, both Watson and Jones altered their focus. They now mainly focus on criticizing feminism, Islam, and left-wing politics. Watson also contributes to InfoWarss talk radio program The Alex Jones Show, which he occasionally hosts or co-hosts. Watson has been working at InfoWars since October 2002.

Since 2011, Watson has hosted his own YouTube channel, prisonplanetlive, on which he expresses his views on topics such as contemporary society, politics, and modern liberalism in an often mocking manner. He rose to prominence on his YouTube channel by criticizing and mocking the "woke mob", social justice warriors, feminism and anti-racist movements. As of January 2021, his channel has over 1.9 million subscribers.

Early life
In a 2016 interview for a student newspaper in his native Sheffield, UK, Watson said he grew up on a council estate with little financial resources, and that by 18, he was teetotal and exercising 3 hours per day. However, a 2018 article for The Daily Beast said his birth certificate indicated the family lived in a house in Grenoside, a semi-rural district in the north of the city, which the Sheffield City Council stated they never owned. From just before the age of ten, Watson and his family lived in Loxley, another area of Sheffield.

Watson described his formative moment as when, at the age of 18, he watched The Secret Rulers of the World, a documentary in which journalist Jon Ronson accompanied Alex Jones in infiltrating Bohemian Grove in California, a place where some conspiracy theorists believe global elites plot the New World Order. He has described British conspiracy theorist David Icke, whom he first read as a teenager, as the person who woke him up. Following the Ronson documentary, according to Watson, he started his own website Propaganda Matrix. He registered Global Propaganda Matrix, the company behind his website, in 2004. Watson has said he was first asked to contribute by Alex Jones in 2002, quickly becoming highly paid for his InfoWars work, according to the ex-wife of the site's founder.

Political self-identification 
Watson, along with Jones and InfoWars as a whole, has shifted from mainly commenting on conspiracy theories such as chemtrails, the New World Order and the Illuminati, to increasingly criticising feminism, Islam, and left-wing politics. Watson has been described as a member of "the new far-right" by The New York Times, which wrote in August 2017 that his "videos are straightforward nativist polemics, with a particular focus on Europe" and convey his opposition to modernist architecture and modern art. Iman Abou Atta, director of the anti-Islamophobia group Tell MAMA, has said that Watson "has become 'the' nexus for anti-Muslim accounts that we have mapped... He has become an influencer in promoting information—much of it bizarre and untrue—which has been regurgitated by anti-Muslim and anti-migrant accounts time and time again."

Watson previously described himself as a libertarian and supported Ron Paul in the 2012 presidential election. In a 2016 tweet, he said he no longer considered himself a libertarian because Gary Johnson "made the term an embarrassment." Watson has also called himself a conservative and considers modern-day conservatism a countercultural movement. In a November 2016 Facebook post, he differentiated between the New Right and the alt-right. He claimed that the alt-right "likes to fester in dark corners of subreddits and obsess about Jews, racial superiority and Adolf Hitler." He and Mike Cernovich have feuded with figures such as Richard B. Spencer and David Duke, who see white nationalism as necessary for the alt-right. 

Although he endorsed Donald Trump in the 2016 presidential election, Watson declared in a tweet on 6 April 2017, he was "officially OFF the Trump train" after Trump's decision to launch missile strikes on Syria in response to a Khan Shaykhun chemical attack several days earlier, believing Trump had reneged on his promise not to intervene in Syria. He said Trump was "just another deep state/Neo-con puppet". After a decrease in Twitter followers occurred, he denied he had "turned on Trump", saying he was only "off the Trump train in terms of Syria" and blaming the media for "fake news". He declared in a separate tweet he would shift his focus to ensuring French presidential candidate Marine Le Pen of the National Front would be elected in the 2017 election, which she lost. Donald Trump Jr. retweeted Watson's reference to French celebrities leaving France if Le Pen was elected and referred dismissively to similar reputed claims in the U.S. before Trump Sr. was elected.

On 16 June 2018, Watson announced that he had joined the UK Independence Party along with Mark Meechan and Carl Benjamin.

In traditional media 
In 2016, Watson was an early proponent of allegations that Hillary Clinton suffers from numerous serious medical conditions, though he was unable to provide any evidence. Watson's part in the manufacture and dissemination of the rumour was taken up by the National Enquirer and mentioned in the mainstream media as part of a discussion of the role of rumour and conspiracy theory in the 2016 U.S. presidential election.

In February 2017, Watson tweeted an offer to pay for a journalist to visit Sweden and stay in the "crime ridden migrant suburbs" of Malmö, if they think it would be safe. Many journalists took him up on the offer, and Watson chose New York journalist and videographer Tim Pool, who was already planning a similar investigation. Watson gave Pool $2,000 for the trip. Pool's findings contradicted Watson's claims.

At a November 2018 White House press briefing, persistent questioning of Trump led an intern to attempt to take a microphone from the hand of CNN's Jim Acosta. Acosta's White House press credentials were subsequently revoked, allegedly for having "put his hands" on the intern. Watson uploaded an edited version of the original footage in support of this claim. In this version, zoom and frame rate changes create the misleading impression that Acosta had behaved aggressively towards the intern.

Watson confirmed that he had applied a zoom and denied making any other alterations, though expert analysis confirmed that "the clip repeats several frames that do not appear in the original footage" and that it had been sped up. The video has generally been described as doctored, though some experts concluded that the changes do not necessarily represent deliberate manipulation but could be artefacts of accidental degradation during processing. White House Press Secretary Sarah Huckabee Sanders pointed to the video that Watson posted as clearly documenting Acosta's "inappropriate behaviour." The White House was criticised for sharing a doctored video and thereby spreading "actual fake news" rather than using the original footage. A subsequent court ruling found that the action against Acosta was unconstitutional on due process grounds.

On 2 May 2019, Watson and several other people considered to be extremists, including Nation of Islam leader Louis Farrakhan, Jones, and right-wing commentator Milo Yiannopoulos, were permanently banned from Facebook, which called them "dangerous." "We've always banned individuals or organizations that promote or engage in violence and hate, regardless of ideology", a Facebook spokesperson said. "The process for evaluating potential violators is extensive and it is what led us to our decision to remove these accounts today." Watson tweeted that he had broken "none of their rules" and complained of "an authoritarian society controlled by a handful of Silicon Valley giants" in which "all dissent must be purged." Trump retweeted Watson, mocking the "dangerous" epithet.

Views

Immigration 
Watson is anti-immigration. He has claimed that "Malmö is known as 'Sweden's Chicago'" due to mass immigration into the country. According to a study published in Critical Studies in Media Communication, this claim is false.

In 2022, Watson used the murder of a Jewish man in Paris to attack French President Emmanuel Macron and France's African migrant communities.

Islam 
Watson is opposed to Islam. He has labelled Muslim culture "horrific" and declared that it produces mass rape, "Islamic ghettos" and the destruction of Western culture. Watson has said that the western world needs "Islam control" rather than gun control. In an InfoWars article, Watson wrote, "Muslims living in both the Middle East and the west show alarmingly high levels of support for violent jihad" and that there is "violent oppression of gays and Christians in the Middle East". In August 2017, he said that YouTube had blocked monetisation on all his videos about Islam as part of the website's policies dealing with hate speech, and on other subjects including modern art.

Race and ethnicity 
Watson has criticised perceived racial tokenism. In 2017, he criticised the BBC for "portraying Roman Britain as ethnically diverse" after the broadcaster included a black Roman centurion in an educational cartoon. His criticism was contradicted by Mary Beard and Cambridge's Faculty of Classics, saying there was overwhelming evidence that Roman Britain was a multi-ethnic society, but noting that this would have been more noticeable in a military or urban setting than a rural one and the significant gaps in historians' understanding of the topic.

Watson has released content falsely linking race to IQ, and lower IQ to aggression.

In May 2022, Byline Times and the Southern Poverty Law Center published an account of a recording apparently of Watson at a party saying: "I really think you should press the button to wipe Jews off the face of the Earth" and making other homophobic and racist comments, such as saying: "I care about white people and not sand nigger Paki Jew faggot coons". The recording has been confirmed by three secondary sources. In response, Joe Mulhall of Hope not Hate said that while Watson was careful to follow social media platform moderation policy, it was not surprising that he would express such views in private.

References

External links 

1982 births
Living people
9/11 conspiracy theorists
Alt-right writers
British critics of Islam
British male bloggers
Conservatism in the United Kingdom
Critics of multiculturalism
English bloggers
English conspiracy theorists
English YouTubers
Far-right politics in England
InfoWars people
Male critics of feminism
Anti-Islam sentiment in the United Kingdom
People from Ecclesfield
UK Independence Party people
British white nationalists
Antisemitism in England
Anti-black racism in England
Anti-abortion activists
Discrimination against LGBT people
Transphobia in the United Kingdom